Georg Baur (April 2, 1895 – April 1, 1975) was a German politician of the Christian Democratic Union (CDU) and former member of the German Bundestag.

Life 
Baur became co-founder of the CDU in Donzdorf and was also elected as its chairman in the Göppingen district council. In 1948, he became a member of the Economic Council for the United Economic Area and remained so until 1949, when he was elected to the Bundestag for the constituency (Göppingen) in the 1949 federal election. He was a full member of the Committee for Cultural Policy and also a deputy member of other committees. After his retirement from the Bundestag after the 1953 federal elections, he became chairman of the North Württemberg Agricultural Committee. From 1956 to 1960 he was a member of the state parliament of Baden-Württemberg for one legislative period.

Literature

References

1895 births
1975 deaths
Members of the Bundestag for Baden-Württemberg
Members of the Bundestag 1949–1953
Members of the Bundestag for the Christian Democratic Union of Germany
Members of the Landtag of Baden-Württemberg